La Unión is a town and municipality located in the Sucre Department, northern Colombia.

References
 Gobernacion de Sucre - La Unión
 La Unión official website

Sucre